Lampanyctus steinbecki is a species of lanternfish.

References

Lampanyctus
Fish described in 1939
Taxa named by Rolf Ling Bolin